New Change may refer to:

 A street in London, replacing Old Change that was demolished during World War II
 One New Change, a shopping area in the City of London